The Castilla–La Mancha Football Federation (FFCM) is the football association responsible for all competitions of any form of football developed in Castilla–La Mancha. It is integrated into the Royal Spanish Football Federation and its headquarters are located in Cuenca.

Competitions
 Men's
 Tercera División (Group 18)
 Primera Autonómica Preferente (2 groups)
 Primera División Autonómica (4 group)
 Segunda División Autonómica (5 group)
 Youth
 Liga Nacional Juvenil Group XV
 Divisiones Regionales
 Women's
 Divisiones Regionales

See also 
List of Spanish regional football federations

References

External links 
  

Spanish football associations
Football in Castilla–La Mancha